Lagnus longimanus is a species of spider in the family Salticidae (jumping spiders). It is endemic to Fiji.

References

Salticidae
Spiders of Fiji
Endemic fauna of Fiji
Spiders described in 1879